Dokar Gewog (Dzongkha: རྡོ་དཀར་) is a gewog (village block) of Paro District, Bhutan. In 2002, the gewog had an area of 106.1 square kilometres and contained 21 villages and 327 households.

References 

Gewogs of Bhutan
Paro District